Palaiseau is a commune in the southern suburbs of Paris, France. Palaiseau is a sub-prefecture of the Essonne department and the seat of the Arrondissement of Palaiseau.

Inhabitants of Palaiseau are known as Palaisiens.

Population

Education
, the primary schools in Palaiseau have 2,770 students. There are 12 public preschools (maternelles) and 10 public elementary schools.

Public secondary schools:
 Junior high schools: Collège César-Franck, Collège Charles-Péguy, Collège Joseph-Bara
 Senior high schools: Lycée professionnel Henri-Poincaré, Lycée Camille Claudel

The Institution Saint-Martin is a private school from preschool to high school.

Colleges and universities
ParisTech has a strong presence in Palaiseau, with four member institutes: the École Polytechnique (one of the most prestigious engineering schools in France), École nationale de la statistique et de l'administration économique, École nationale supérieure de techniques avancées, and Institut d'optique Graduate School which are now located in Palaiseau, on the Plateau de Saclay.

Transport
Palaiseau is served by 3 stations on Paris RER line B: Palaiseau, Palaiseau – Villebon and Lozère (this last station is the closest to École Polytechnique). The station Massy-Palaiseau (RER B, RER C and also TGV, the French high-speed rail) is located in the nearby town of Massy.

Twin towns

Palaiseau is twinned with Unna, Germany.

See also
Communes of the Essonne department

References

External links

Mayors of Essonne Association 
Official website 

Communes of Essonne
Subprefectures in France